The women's scratch race at the 2022 Commonwealth Games, as part of the cycling programme, took place on 1 August 2022.

Schedule
The schedule was as follows:

All times are British Summer Time (UTC+1)

Results

Final
40 laps (10 km) were raced.

References

Cycling at the Commonwealth Games – Women's scratch
Women's scratch race
2022 in women's track cycling